Pickering House may refer to:

I. O. Pickering House, Olathe, Kansas
Pickering House (Salem, Massachusetts), NRHP-listed
Pickering House (Victoria, Texas), NRHP-listed
Pickering Farm, Issaquah, Washington

See also
Adams-Pickering Block, Bangor, Maine, NRHP-listed
Fort Pickering, Salem, Massachusetts, NRHP-listed
Middle Pickering Rural Historic District, Phoenixville, Pennsylvania